Flabellina evelinae is a species of sea slug, an aeolid nudibranch, a marine gastropod mollusc in the family Flabellinidae.

Distribution
This species was described from Nigeria.

References

Endemic fauna of Nigeria
Flabellinidae
Gastropods described in 1989
Invertebrates of West Africa